Abdur Rahman is a masculine Muslim name derived from the Arabic name Abd al-Rahman.

Abdur Rahman, Abdur Rehman, Abdul Rahman, Abdul Rehman or variants may also refer to:

People

Abdel Rahman 
Abdel Rahman Massad (born 1957), Sudanese Olympic athlete

Abdul Rahman 
Abdul Rahman of Negeri Sembilan (1895–1960) King of Malaysia
Abdul Rahman (Afghan cricketer), Afghan cricketer
Abdul Rahman (Afghan cricketer, born 2001), Afghan cricketer
Abdul Rahman (Afghan minister) (1953–2002), murdered Afghan minister of aviation and tourism
Abdul Rahman (convert) (born 1965), Afghan Christian who faced the death penalty for converting from Islam
Abdul Rahman (Guantanamo detainee 357) (born 1976), Afghan detainee
Abdul Rahman (politician) (born 1959), Indian politician
Abdul Breesam Rahman (born 1961), Iraqi Olympic wrestler
S. Abdul Rahman (1937–2017), Tamil writer

Abdur Rahman 
Abdur Rahman (actor) (1937–2005), Bangladeshi film actor and director
Abdur Rahman (Bangladeshi cricketer) (born 1990), Bangladeshi cricketer
Abdur Rahman (Islamic scholar) (1920–2015), Islamic scholar of Bangladesh
Abdur Rahman (politician) (born 1950), Bangladesh Awami League politician
Abdur Rahman (Noakhali politician)
Abdur Rahman ibn Yusuf Mangera (born 1974), Islamic scholar of the United Kingdom, founder of ZamZam Academy and Whitethread Institute
Addahamāṇa (modernised as Abdur Rahman), Apabhramsha poet known for writing the 12th century work Sandeśarāsaka

Abdul Rehman 
Abdul Rehman (athlete) (born 1929), Pakistani Olympic sprinter
Abdul Rehman (boxer) (born 1938), Pakistani boxer
Abdul Rehman (Emirati cricketer) (born 1987), United Arab Emirates cricket player
Abdul Rehman (footballer) (born 1982), Pakistani footballer
Abdul Rehman Muzammil (born 1989), Pakistani cricketer

Abdur Rehman 
Abdur Rehman (cricketer), (born 1980) Pakistani international cricketer
Abdur Rehman (cricketer, born 1969), Sui, Pakistan
Abdur Rehman (cricketer, born 1989), Lahore, Pakistan
Abdur Rehman (Kalat cricketer) (active 1969–70), Kalat, Pakistan
Abdur Rehman Peshawari (1886–1925), Turkish soldier, journalist and diplomat

Places 
Aşağı Əbdürrəhmanlı, Azerbaijan
Yuxarı Əbdürrəhmanlı, Azerbaijan
Sidi Abderrahmane, Chlef, a town in Algeria
Sidi Abdel Rahman, a settlement in Egypt
Abdu Rahiman Nagar, a village in Kerala, India
Abdul Rachman Saleh Airport, Malang, Indonesia
Menzel Abderrahmane, a town in Tunisia

Education 
Universiti Tunku Abdul Rahman
Tunku Abdul Rahman College
B. S. Abdur Rahman University, a private university in Chennai (Madras), India
Princess Nora bint Abdul Rahman University, a women's university in Riyadh, Saudi Arabia
Tunku Abdul Rahman Foundation
Sekolah Tuanku Abdul Rahman, a boys school in Malaysia

Other uses 
Abdul Rahman Mosque, the largest mosque in Kabul
Tuanku Abdul Rahman Stadium
KD Tunku Abdul Rahman, a submarine of the Royal Malaysian Navy
Jalan Tuanku Abdul Rahman, a road in Kuala Lumpur, Malaysia
Datuk Patinggi Haji Abdul Rahman Bridge, a bridge crossing the Sarawak River in Kuching, Sarawak, Malaysia
Tunku Abdul Rahman National Park
Expedition of Abdur Rahman bin Auf